Bill Belsey is a Canadian politician, who represented the electoral district of North Coast in the Legislative Assembly of British Columbia from 2001 to 2005. He sat as a member of the BC Liberal Party.

Following his electoral defeat in 2005, Belsey was elected vice-president of the BC Liberal Party in 2011. He was implicated in a potential conflict of interest in 2012, when he was directly involved in correspondence with cabinet minister Pat Bell about regulatory matters pertaining to Sun Wave Forest Products, Belsey's employer at the time.

Electoral record

References

External links
Profile at the Legislative Assembly of British Columbia

British Columbia Liberal Party MLAs
Living people
Year of birth missing (living people)
People from Prince Rupert, British Columbia
21st-century Canadian politicians